Benjamin Pratnemer (born 31 March 1979) is a professional Slovenian darts player.

Career

Pratnemer won the PDC Eastern Europe World Championship qualifier in 2019, defeating János Végső of Hungary 6–1 in the final, which meant he qualified for the 2020 PDC World Darts Championship. He became the second Slovenian after Osmann Kijamet in 2010 to qualify for the event.

On 7 February 2020, he qualified for his first PDC European Tour event. He played in the 2020 Belgian Darts Championship, where he lost 5–6 in the first round against Wesley Plaisier. Since 2021 Pratnamer has been playing on the WDF Circuit picking up a couple of wins in Slovenia & Hungary.

In 2023, Pratnemer participated in the PDC 2023 Q-School, in an attempt to get a tourcard. He got to the final phase, where he finished 28th with 3 points.

World Championship results

PDC
 2020: First round (lost to Justin Pipe 2–3)

WDF
 2023:

Performance timeline

BDO

PDC

References

External links

1979 births
Living people
Slovenian darts players
Professional Darts Corporation associate players